Bangalore Naatkal is a 2016 Indian Tamil-language comedy drama film directed by Bommarillu Bhaskar, which is a remake of the 2014 Malayalam film Bangalore Days written and directed by Anjali Menon. Featuring an ensemble cast consisting of Sri Divya, Bobby Simha, Arya, it tells the story of three cousins who live their childhood dream of living and enjoying in the city of Bangalore. It also stars Rana Daggubati, Parvathy Thiruvothu (who reprises her role from the original), Raai Laxmi, Paris Laxmi, Prakash Raj and in other pivotal roles. Samantha Ruth Prabhu appears in a cameo. Produced by Prasad V Potluri under his banner PVP cinema, the film released on 5 February 2016. Unlike the original, this movie received mixed reviews and failed at the box office, with critics and fans drawing comparisons with the original.

Plot
The film's story revolves around three cousins Divya "Ammu" Raghavan, Kannan "Kutty" and Arjun "Ajju", who share a close bond since their childhood. Kutty is a software engineer whose heart and soul are still in his village. Ajju, whose parents are divorced, is a bike mechanic who lives his life on his own terms. Ammu has completed her B.Com and aspires to do her MBA from IIM but is compelled to marry a workaholic corporate executive, Shivaprasad "Prasad" because of her family astrologer's dire predictions. After their wedding, Ammu moves to Bangalore as Prasad is settled there. Kutty too relocates to Bangalore for his job, while Ajju joins a biker gang as a mechanic in the same city.

Ammu feels lonely as Prasad often goes on long corporate trips and ignores her. Her only solace is the time she gets to spend with her cousins. One day, upon inspecting a room in their apartment that Prasad never lets anyone enter, she is shocked to find it filled with photos, knickknacks and possessions of a woman. In thought of not having a place in Prasad's heart and life, she leaves Prasad and returns to her village in sorrow.

Naive Kutty, who wants a traditional, modest, saree-clad girl for a wife, falls in love with an air hostess Lakshmi on a flight from Bangalore to Coimbatore. They date, and Kutty changes from a reserved and shy person to a trendy person to impress her, but his dreams are shattered when her ex-boyfriend arrives at her apartment, and he realizes that she was only trying to get back with him. He breaks off his relationship with her.

Ajju was a bike racer, but due to a misdemeanor, he is forced to serve a one-year ban from racing. Rakesh, who is now a top-bike racer, troubles Ajju. Ajju eventually hits him but is stopped by Coach Zachariah. Rakesh tells that Ajju is best at fighting, but he is best in racing. Ajju falls for RJ Sarah, but when he meets her in person, he finds she is a paraplegic. He starts to like her attitude and follows her. They become good friends, but Ajju is saddened when he learns that Sarah is to leave for Australia on a university scholarship.

Meanwhile, as Ammu and Prasad are in the middle of getting a divorce, Ajju learns that a few years back, Prasad was a bike racer. He then went by the name Shiva and was the leader of his biker gang. Shiva had given up on racing after he was involved in an accident that killed his girlfriend Grace (the girl whose photos and possessions that Ammu had discovered in Prasad's room). Upon knowing what happened, Ammu decides to return to Bangalore and works towards her MBA. She gradually wins over a repentant Prasad and soon arranges for him to meet Grace's parents. After the meeting, Prasad is able to let go of his past. Ammu forgives him, and they get their marital life on track.

Ajju gets a chance to race on the same day that Sarah has to leave for Australia. Rakesh also arrives. With Ammu, Kutty and Prasad cheering for him, he wins the race. After the race, Ajju realizes how important Sarah is to him and his life. He pleads with her not to go to Australia. Sarah forgoes her scholarship to stay with him in Bangalore. In the end, Kutty marries his neighbor in Bangalore, a European Bharathanatyam dancer Michelle, who has embraced the culture of India. The film ends with Ammu, Prasad, Ajju, and Sarah breaking into Kutty's room and all of them posing for a photo.

Cast

 Arya as Arjun ("Ajju"), a bike racer and a motorcycle mechanic.
 Bobby Simha as Kannan ("Kutty"), a software engineer who does not like city life
 Sri Divya as Divya (Ammu) B.Com MBA, she marries Shivaprasad
 Rana Daggubati as Shivaprasad, a workaholic corporate executive. (voice dubbed by Azam Sheriff)
 Parvathy Thiruvothu as RJ Sarah Elizabeth, a paraplegic whom Ajju befriends (reprising role from original)
 Raai Laxmi as Lakshmi, an air hostess who has a brief experience with Kutty
 Paris Laxmi as Michelle Kannan, a European Bharatnatyam dancer who has embraced Indian culture (reprising role from original)
 Prakash Raj as Francis, Grace's father
 Vinaya Prasad as Mrs. Francis, Grace's mother (reprising role from original)
 Sijoy Varghese as Coach Zechriah
 Saranya Ponvannan as Kutty's mother
 M. S. Bhaskar as Kutty's father
 Rekha as Sarah's mother 
 Sriranjini as Ammu's mother
 Pattimandram Raja as Raghavan, Divya's father
 Sajid Yahiya as Saamy
 Arjun G. Iyengar as Lakshmi's boyfriend 
 Arjai as Prasad's friend
 Samantha Ruth Prabhu as Grace Francis, Shivaprasad's late girlfriend (cameo appearance)

Production

Development
The success of Anjali Menon's 2014 romantic drama film Bangalore Days, prompted producers Dil Raju and Prasad V Potluri to acquire the Tamil and Telugu remake rights for the film in June 2014. Bommarillu Bhaskar was signed on to direct the film, while the producers sought to cast the seven lead roles from actors who were renowned in both the Tamil and Telugu film industries. Initial reports suggested that the main lead role portrayed by Dulquer Salman would be played by Arya and the roles of the other two cousins would be played by Naga Chaitanya and Samantha Ruth Prabhu. Siddharth was also approached to portray the supporting role played by Fahadh Faasil, while Prasanna and Bharath were also linked to roles in the film. Similarly reports suggested that Nani and Sharwanand were being considered to portray two of the lead roles instead. The team also approached Nazriya to be a part of the cast, but the actress was reluctant to feature in films after her marriage. However a delay in casting led to the film being delayed till the following year.

Casting
In January 2015, the official cast of the film was announced with Arya, Siddharth and Samantha selected, as initially expected. Nithya Menon was also added to the cast to play a different character instead of her role from the original. Meanwhile, Bobby Simha and Sunil were also signed on to play the same role, with Simha in the Tamil film and Sunil in the Telugu version. Simha had requested PVP Cinemas to cast him in the role after being approached by the production studio for a different film. However, by the end of the month, Siddharth and Samantha exited amidst speculation that the pair were uncomfortable to feature opposite each other, after a recent break-up. Subsequently, Rana Daggubati and Sri Divya were bought into replace the pair, while Parvathy Thiruvothu opted to reprise her role from the original ahead of Nithya. Raai Laxmi was signed on to portray the role played by Isha Talwar, while it was reported that Nayanthara was in talks to portray a guest appearance in the film. Nayantara eventually was replaced by Samantha, who worked on the film for a week, shooting for a guest role. Despite indications that Santhosh Narayanan would be selected to compose the film's music, Gopi Sunder was retained from the original. The film was launched in mid March 2015 in Chennai, with the cast attending the ceremony. It was revealed that the Telugu version of the film would be made by a completely different team led by Dil Raju and would start after the Tamil version.

Music
The soundtrack features 6 songs composed by Gopi Sunder. The song I Want To Fly is featured in the film as "Unnodu Vazha" with lyrics completely in Tamil instead of the original English version.
 Track list

Critical reception
Hindustan Times wrote "Bommarillu Bhaskar's just opened Tamil work, Bangalore Naatkal – which is a remake of Anjali Menon's Bangalore Days in Malayalam – also lends itself to a good measure of comparison. Honestly, the core idea behind Menon's work – about the average Keralite's craze for Bangalore (Bengaluru) – does not ring true in Bhaskar's Tamil edition." The Hindu wrote "Bangalore Naatkal quite worked for me, despite the aforementioned minor niggles. It made me well up at all the right moments, even if it didn't get me laughing as much as the original." Times of India wrote "this remake works to a large extent (if you haven't seen the original, even better), because the director, Bommarillu Bhaskar hasn't made any drastic change to the original script and manages to capture the emotional drama of the scenes." Rediff wrote "Remakes are never easy and director Bhaskar's Bangalore Naatkal is far from perfect, but the film does have its moments, especially for those who missed the original." Behindwoods wrote "Overall, despite its lively storyline, Bangalore Naatkal is let down by the treatment and casual performances." IndiaGlitz.com gave 2.8/5 and wrote "  Bangalore days is fresh, youthful and certainly a good one time watch with family for its entertainment quotient is spot on

Box office

References

External links
 

2016 films
2010s Tamil-language films
2010s buddy comedy-drama films
Indian buddy comedy-drama films
Tamil remakes of Malayalam films
Films directed by Bhaskar
Films scored by Gopi Sundar
Films set in Bangalore
2016 comedy-drama films